Katara is a fictional character in the Nickelodeon animated television series Avatar: The Last Airbender (2005–2008) and its sequel series The Legend of Korra (2012–2014). The character, created by Michael Dante DiMartino and Bryan Konietzko, is voiced by Mae Whitman in the original series and Eva Marie Saint in the sequel series, The Legend of Korra. She is Chief Hakoda and Kya’s daughter and Sokka’s younger sister. In the 2010 live action film adaptation, she was played by Nicola Peltz, while in the 2023 live-action television series adaptation, she will be portrayed by Kiawentiio.

Katara is a 14-year-old "waterbender", meaning that she has the ability to telekinetically control water and ice. At the beginning of the story, she is the only person with such abilities in the Southern Water Tribe, one of three known communities in which waterbending is practiced. She and her older brother, Sokka, discover an "airbender" (one who can telekinetically control and manipulate air) named Aang frozen in an iceberg. They free him and accompany him on his quest to defeat the imperialistic Fire Nation and bring peace to the war-torn world. She later earns the title of Master Waterbender from Master Pakku of the Northern Water Tribe.

Katara has appeared in other media, such as trading cards, T-shirts, video games and web comics.

Creation and conception
According to the un-aired pilot episode, Katara's name was originally 'Kya'. Nickelodeon's legal department vetoed the name when they discovered there was already a video game character named Kya, so they had to change it. 'Kanna' was first proposed to replace Kya, but it was used to name her grandmother instead. 'Kya' was later used for Katara's then-unnamed deceased mother. In "The Tales of Ba Sing Se", Katara's name was written as 卡 塔 拉. Kǎ (卡) means to check, block, or card; Tǎ (塔) means pagoda; and Lā (拉) means to pull. The character 'Lā' appears in the first season's finale as the name of the Ocean Spirit, while the character 'Kǎ' also appears in Sokka's name.

Bryan Konietzko and Michael Dante DiMartino originally conceived Aang, Katara, and Sokka as younger characters, but they were all aged-up by two years during development at the insistence of executive producer Eric Coleman, who said that Nickelodeon was not looking for coming-of-age stories. When the show began, Aang went from being 10 years old to 12, Katara from 12 to 14, and Sokka from 13 to 15 years old.

In the commentary of the unaired pilot episode, co-creators Bryan Konietzko and Michael Dante DiMartino state that Katara's "hair loopies" were intended to hang downward. The idea for her tied-back hair loopies came from Tin House animation director Yoon Young Ki, making it so that her hair was easier to animate.

In "The Women of Avatar: The Last Airbender" special on The Complete Book Three Collection, Michael Dante DiMartino and Bryan Konietzko have stated that they envision Katara as the deuteragonist of the series, as well as the "person the story is being told through".

Personality
Katara is described as "smart, capable", and as "kind, brave, and passionate." In many situations, Katara appears as a mother to the other protagonists: a role attributed to her tribe's losses to raids and the departure of many members to war, which required her (as well as her brother Sokka) to assume responsibilities beyond her age. Katara tends to be kind and generous, but is often stubborn or confined by her morals; becomes angry if doubted, insulted, or betrayed; and carries resentment for years on end. She is commonly a mother figure to Sokka, who sometimes resents her for this but also takes her for granted.

Plot overview

Avatar: The Last Airbender television series

Book One: Water
When Katara was eight years old, her mother, Kya, sacrificed her life during a Fire Nation raid in order to protect Katara, since she was the only waterbender in the southern tribe. Though her interests lay in developing her waterbending skills, she resigned herself to cooking and cleaning duties while her brother, Sokka, trained to become a warrior. Three years later, Katara's father Hakoda, and the other warriors journey to the Earth Kingdom to oppose the Fire Nation, leaving Katara, Sokka, and their grandmother Kanna to look after the tribe.

The events of Avatar: The Last Airbender begins six years later, when Katara and Sokka find Aang in suspended animation and identify him as the Avatar, a messianic figure. To assist the Avatar and to further her mastery of waterbending, Katara joins Aang in his quest to reach the Northern Water Tribe and find a waterbending master, with Sokka alongside them. Upon arrival, Master Pakku refuses her apprenticeship because the customs of the Northern Water Tribe dictate that women cannot learn waterbending as a martial art, but upon noticing Katara's necklace, which he himself gave to Katara's grandmother, he agrees to teach her. Katara having achieved her own expertise, Pakku deems her sufficient to teach Aang.

Book Two: Earth
Katara then accompanies Aang to the Earth Kingdom for him to learn earthbending. At an Earth Kingdom stronghold, General Fong places Katara's life in danger to induce Aang's Avatar State, but achieves only destruction. After the earthbender Toph BeiFong joins the group to teach Aang, Katara and Toph initially quarrel but thereafter become friends. In the Earth Kingdom's capital, Katara encounters antagonist Prince Zuko and his sister Azula; during the battle, Aang is injured by Azula's lightning, whereupon Katara takes him to safety and eventually mostly heals his physical wounds.

Book Three: Fire
In a village burdened by the Fire Nation's pollution, Katara disguises herself as the river spirit the Painted Lady in order to help the village. While staying with the semi-reclusive Hama, the protagonists learn she is a waterbender from the Southern Tribe who was imprisoned by the Fire Nation. Later, she offers to teach Katara a waterbending technique called "bloodbending", which enables physical control of animals and humans. When Katara refuses to learn this technique, Hama uses it on Aang and Sokka, forcing Katara to use the technique herself on Hama. When Prince Zuko joins the protagonists after the Invasion fails and gains everyone's trust, he fails to do so with Katara until he assists her in finding the man who was responsible for killing her mother, during the process of which she uses bloodbending. Though deciding not to take her revenge nor forgive, she does come to terms with Zuko and accepts him as her friend.

During the four-part series finale, Katara assists Zuko in preventing Azula from becoming Fire Lord and battles her, eventually defeating her, and heals Zuko. When the war ends, she is seen in Ba Sing Se with the other protagonists and shares a kiss with Aang, starting a romantic relationship with him.

Avatar: The Last Airbender comic series

The Promise

The Search

The Rift

Smoke and Shadow

North and South

Imbalance

Katara and the Pirate's Silver

The Legend of Korra

Book One: Air
In the sequel series The Legend of Korra, Katara, now eighty-five, is one of the three surviving members of the original Team Avatar, along with Zuko and Toph. She is a high-ranking member of the White Lotus and took it upon herself to train Korra in waterbending, becoming the latest in a line of masters to serve as a teacher to multiple Avatars. Katara and Aang are also revealed to have had three children: the non-bender Bumi (who later acquires the ability to airbend), the waterbender Kya, and the airbender Tenzin. She plays a minor role in the first season of the series, only giving Korra her blessing to leave for Republic City to train with Tenzin and attempting to unsuccessfully heal her after she loses her waterbending, earthbending, and firebending abilities to Amon.

Book Two: Spirits
In the second-season premiere "Rebel Spirit", Katara is seen celebrating with her children at the Southern Water Tribe's Glacier Spirits Festival. While together with them, Katara, holding her new grandson Rohan, watches sadly as she notices Kya and Bumi joking at Tenzin's expense. At the end of the episode, Katara implores that Tenzin take his brother and sister with him to the Southern Air Temple, saying that he will enjoy looking back on the time he had to spend with his siblings and that it might be best for the three to visit their father's home together. In "Harmonic Convergence", Katara is seen in her healing hut tending to injured Southern Water Tribe soldiers, and later used healing to keep her granddaughter Jinora's body alive while her soul was trapped in the spirit world. In Light in the Dark, she is seen listening to Avatar Korra addressing the independent Southern Water Tribe and how she decided to have spirits and human coexist by leaving the spirit portals open.

Book Four: Balance
In the fourth season episode "Korra Alone", Katara aids Korra in healing her body after being poisoned by Zaheer at the end of the third season, enabling her to walk again after being a wheelchair user for over six months.

Abilities
Katara's abilities develop considerably throughout the series. At the outset, she has little control over her waterbending and often loses control in moments of frustration or anger. Thanks to diligent practice, an instruction scroll, and tutelage under a master, her skill improves until she is deemed a master herself. She was chosen to be Korra's master, and taught her waterbending and healing.

Waterbending
Katara is highly skilled in waterbending, which utilizes Chinese martial arts techniques of "internal style" T'ai chi ch'uan and Jeet Kune Do; Katara is the only surviving master of "Southern style waterbending" after the 100-year war. The series' creators consulted a professional martial artist in the design of the show's fighting style. Waterbending represents the element of change – a shapeshifter constantly changing forms – and is categorized as the most adaptive or pliable of the "four bending arts". Waterbending emphasizes "softness and breathing" over "hard aggression"; fluid and graceful, acting in concert with the environment; and creating opportunities where none exist. This "flow of energy" allows their defensive maneuvers to translate into focus on control and counter-offenses, turning their opponents' momentum against them. Despite these advantages, waterbending is almost entirely dependent on inertia; it is essential for practitioners to not be rigid, but to be fluid and able to adapt to any situation.

Katara has demonstrated to be a formidable opponent to her enemies, able to fight on equal terms with Azula and Long Feng; she eventually outmatched the Fire Nation princess to demonstrate the extent of her skill. Katara can use water to cut through objects; summon lashing waves and whips of varying sizes; cover herself with a sheath of water; surf on a length of ice; run and stand on the surface of water; melt and control existing ice; form ice into various shapes; freeze water and objects surrounded by water with little effort; create walls of mist and steam; transform steam into ice; evaporate large amounts of water; or derive a weapon from any moisture including her own perspiration. She can control huge amounts of water at a time, forming huge waves and bubbles of water. On one instance, Katara knocked down the entire Dai Li, Zuko, and Azula while riding atop a giant wave. As with all waterbenders, Katara's powers increase under the influence of a full moon.

Katara demonstrates the ability to levitate and control water-based liquids, as well as pure water, in the episode "The Southern Raiders", wherein Katara bends ink onto a map. She is also seen bending soup (which allows her to cook meals), and bends perfume while battling a smell-dependent monster. In the episode "The Painted Lady," she uses her bending to create a thick fog. Katara also demonstrates the ability to bend sweat and the ability to manipulate mud with Toph, who manipulates the dirt while Katara controls the water.

Healing abilities
Katara is one of the few waterbenders born with the sub-ability of healing injuries or wounds, first demonstrated after she is burned by Aang's first attempt at firebending. She strengthens this ability under the tutelage of the Northern Water Tribe's healer Yagoda. She uses it thereafter to relieve sickness; overcome brainwashing; and heal wounds such as burns and bleeding injuries. Nevertheless, she cannot cure all sicknesses, mend brain damage, or heal internal injuries and birth defects. Using special water she obtained from the Northern Water Tribe's Spirit Shrine, she was able to heal a fatal wound Azula inflicted upon Aang, thus reviving him from death. She speculated that she would be able to use that same water to heal the scar on Zuko's face, but was interrupted before she could do so. By the time of The Legend of Korra, Lin Beifong (Toph's metalbender daughter) claims that she is the best healer in the world.

Bloodbending
Katara knows another waterbending technique known as "bloodbending". She first used this technique in the eighth episode of Book Three. This ability consists in manipulating the water inside a creature's body, leaving the target unable to move or resist in any way. Once she has taken control, she can make it move in any manner she desires. She is only able to bloodbend during a full moon, when her waterbending power is at its peak. Katara was forced to learn bloodbending by Hama, an elderly Water Tribe woman who originally developed the technique and who wanted Katara to learn it for it to be passed on to others. However, Katara abhors this technique and has only used it twice in times of great stress. In later years, she worked to make the practice a criminal offense and ended up banning it in Republic City.

Appearances in other media
Katara's character appeared in the Avatar: The Last Airbender Trading Card Game and three THQ video games including the eponymous video game and Avatar: The Last Airbender – The Burning Earth and Avatar: The Last Airbender – Into the Inferno.

Like Aang, Katara also appeared in Tokyopop's films comic (sometimes referred to as cine-manga).

Nicola Peltz portrayed Katara in the 2010 film adaptation of the series, The Last Airbender, directed by M. Night Shyamalan. The film was universally panned by critics and audiences. Many reviewers cited inconsistencies within the plot and between the screenplay and the source material, as well as the acting, characterization, writing and casting and has been considered to be one of the worst adaptations ever made.

Kiawentiio will portray Katara in the upcoming live-action television series adaptation,  The Last Airbender. DiMartino and Konietzko were initially announced to be the executive producers and showrunners, but they later left the production.

Reception
Katara's character was received positively. She was compared by Jade King of The Gamer to Amity Blight in The Owl House, arguing there are similarities between these two characters, despite differences in design and delivery of each character. Jay Oh of CBR said that Katara is a "staple" of Avatar: The Last Airbender and "a legend in her own right". Hannah Grimes of CBR stated that Katara is "rather mature and level-headed" compared to others in Team Avatar, and a "strong addition" for the Team. Hannah Shaw-Williams of ScreenRant said that Katara is "humble" Amanda Bruce, also of ScreenRant, called Katara inspirational, and argued she is "built on hope and logic". Rachel Sandell of Collider argued that Katara had one of the "best character arcs" in Avatar: The Last Airbender and a female protagonist not afraid to "admit areas in which she can grow". Other reviewers called her "interesting" "very likable" and said that she is a fan-favorite. Some fans even performed cosplay of Katara.

Family tree

References

External links

 Katara at Nick.com

Animated human characters
Avatar: The Last Airbender characters
Female characters in animated series
Fictional aboriginal people in the Polar regions
Fictional characters with accelerated healing
Fictional characters with healing abilities
Fictional characters with ice or cold abilities
Fictional characters with water abilities
Fictional child soldiers
Fictional female martial artists
Fictional hapkido practitioners
Fictional martial arts trainers
Fictional medical personnel
Fictional tai chi practitioners
Fictional telekinetics
Fictional tribal chiefs
Fictional war veterans
Fictional women soldiers and warriors
Teenage characters in television
Television characters introduced in 2005
Animated characters introduced in 2005
Child superheroes
Teenage superheroes
es:Anexo:Personajes de Avatar: la leyenda de Aang#Katara